Rochester is an unincorporated community and census-designated place (CDP) in Rochester Township, Cedar County, Iowa, United States. As of the 2010 census it had a population of 133.

History
Rochester was named after Rochester, New York, known for its flour mills, due to its location on the Cedar River. Rochester's population was 53 in 1902.

Geography
Rochester is located in eastern Iowa in south-central Cedar County, along the north bank of the Cedar River.

Demographics

Area of Interest
Rochester Cemetery:
The Rochester Cemetery is one of the few remaining original prairie remnants in the state of Iowa. The cemetery has divided many in the community that think that it looks overgrown while others appreciate the native feel.

References

Census-designated places in Cedar County, Iowa
Census-designated places in Iowa